Brunei or Brunei Darussalam in full has competed seven times in the Commonwealth Games to date, beginning in 1958.

Medal tally

The state of Brunei or Brunei Darussalam is unranked on the all-time medal tally of the Commonwealth Games, having never won a medal.

History

Brunei Darussalam became independent in 1984, and first participated at the Commonwealth Games in 1990, held in Auckland, New Zealand. 

There may have been a participant from Brunei at the 1958 British Empire and Commonwealth Games in Cardiff, but Brunei is not shown on the medal standings for that Games, however the programme for the Opening Ceremony of the 1958 games shows Brunei in the list of teams participating.

References

 
Brunei and the Commonwealth of Nations
Nations at the Commonwealth Games